The following highways are numbered 891:

United States
Territories
  Puerto Rico Highway 891

West Virginia
  West Virginia Route 891